Abdukadir Osman, also known as Abdukadir Oromo, was a Somali writer. He was born and spent most of his life in Somalia, especially the capital Mogadishu. Osman wrote numerous books, most of which are centered on local politics. In his later years, he resided in London. He died there on 15 July 2014 while undergoing treatment at a hospital. he was born in Dusamareb Galgaduud.

See also
Ahmed Sheikh Jama

References

2014 deaths
Ethnic Somali people
Somalian writers
Somalian Muslims
Year of birth missing